"Let's Straighten It Out" is the name of a hit song by blues singer Latimore.  The first version of the song appeared on his second album More, More, More, the single spent two weeks at number one on the R&B singles chart in November, 1974.  It also peaked at number 31 on the Billboard Hot 100 singles chart. After signing with Malaco Records, Latimore would re-record the song in 1983 for his eighth album, I'll Do Anything For You, with a spoken introduction.

The single was covered by R&B singers Monica and Usher for the Panther soundtrack in 1995. In 1995 a longer version of the same recording appeared on Monica's debut album, Miss Thang. The song has also been covered by O.V. Wright (1978), Gwen McCrae (1978), B.B. King (1989), Millie Jackson
(1994), Etta James (2002), Clarence Carter (2011), and Eli "Paperboy" Reed (2020).

References

1974 singles
1974 songs
Monica (singer) songs
Usher (musician) songs
Male–female vocal duets
Malaco Records singles